Sir Vincent Zachary Cope MD MS FRCS (14 February 1881 – 28 December 1974) was an English physician, surgeon, author, historian and poet perhaps best known for authoring the book Cope's Early Diagnosis of the Acute Abdomen from 1921 until 1971. The work remains a respected and standard text of general surgery, and new editions continue being published by editors long after his death, the most recent one being the 22nd edition, published in 2010. Cope also wrote widely on the history of medicine and of public dispensaries.

Early life 
Cope was the youngest of ten children of a minister, Thomas John Cope and his wife Celia Anne Crowle. He was head boy at Westminster City School where he was awarded a gold medal in 1899 and then a scholarship to go to St Mary's Hospital Medical School. He passed surgery and forensic medicine with distinction in 1905 and became house physician to David Lees, author of The Abdominal Inflammations. Lees influenced Cope in his lifelong interest, the acute abdomen.

Surgical career 
In 1906, Cope began work at Bolingbroke Hospital before joining the Royal Army Medical Corps in 1914. In 1916 he went to Baghdad, Mesopotamia. It was here that he wrote his first book Surgical aspects of dysentery published in 1921. Cope was considered an "eminent authority" on acute abdominal disorders. Influenced by Augustus D Waller and Almroth Wright, he published many books including Cope's Early Diagnosis of the Acute Abdomen also in 1921.

Cope is quoted to have said that "the good surgeon must feel for his patients, but never let this sympathy disturb his judgement or treatment".

Cope is recorded to have been a small man who stood on a stool, named 'Cope's stool' when operating.

Ministry of Health 
Involved in surveying hospital facilities, medical staffing levels and auxiliary training, Cope was active in chairing committees for the Ministry of Health and in editing their reports between 1949 and 1952. He received a knighthood for the work he completed on medicine and surgery in the official medical history of the Second World War.

Notable Works 

1921 - Early Diagnosis of the Acute Abdomen

1939 - Pioneers in Acute Abdominal Surgery - Oxford

1947 - The Diagnosis of the Acute Abdomen in Rhyme (under the pseudonym Zeta)

1954 - The History of St Mary's Hospital Medical School, Paddington

1955 - A Hundred Years of Nursing at St. Mary's Hospital , Paddington 

1957 - Sidelights on the History of Medicine

1959 - The Royal College of Surgeons of England, a history

1961 - Some Famous General practitioners and other Medical Historical Essays.

1965 - A History of the Acute Abdomen

Between the ages of 75 years and 85 years, Cope wrote seven biographies including William Cheselden, Florence Nightingale, Almroth Wright and Sir John Tomes.

Personal life 

Described as "modest and friendly", Cope was also "devoted to his family and loved by his friends". He outlived two wives, the first, Dora Newth, dying very young. He married Alice Mary Watts in 1923 and had a daughter.

Cope lived near Hampstead Heath until the death of Alice in 1944 after which he moved to Chiltern Court, Baker Street. He is remembered to spend much time in the library of the RSM after retirement. Between 1950 and 1952, he was president of the Osler Club of London.

Legacy 
St Mary's Hospital, London has a ward named after Cope.

The Royal college of surgeons pays tribute to Cope with the Zachary Cope Memorial Lecture in abdominal surgical disease.

References

Further reading

External links
 

1881 births
1974 deaths
Alumni of the University of London
20th-century English medical doctors
English surgeons
Fellows of the Royal College of Surgeons
People from Kingston upon Hull
Royal Army Medical Corps officers
Presidents of the History of Medicine Society
Presidents of the Osler Club of London
20th-century surgeons